UFC Fight Night: Florian vs. Gomi (also known as UFC Fight Night 21) was a mixed martial arts event held by the Ultimate Fighting Championship on March 31, 2010 at Bojangles' Coliseum in Charlotte, North Carolina,  This was the third time the UFC held an event in Charlotte, but the first since UFC 5, also at the same venue.

Background
The event was the third UFC event in under two weeks along with UFC LIVE: Vera vs. Jones and UFC 111.  The event also served as the lead-in program for The Ultimate Fighter 11.

Cole Miller was scheduled to face Andre Winner, but was forced from the card with an injury and replaced by Rafaello Oliveira.

A brief blackout occurred in the Bojangles' Coliseum when Roy Nelson vs. Stefan Struve was being announced.

Results

Bonus awards 
Fighters were awarded $30,000 bonuses.

Fight of the Night: Ross Pearson vs. Dennis Siver
Knockout of the Night: Roy Nelson
Submission of the Night: Kenny Florian

References

See also
 Ultimate Fighting Championship
 List of UFC champions
 List of UFC events
 2010 in UFC

UFC Fight Night
2010 in mixed martial arts
Mixed martial arts in North Carolina
Sports competitions in Charlotte, North Carolina
2010 in sports in North Carolina
Events in Charlotte, North Carolina